Marvdasht County is in Fars province, Iran. The capital of the county is the city of Marvdasht. At the 2006 census, the county's population was 294,621 in 69,244 households. The following census in 2011 counted 307,492 people in 83,641 households. At the 2016 census, the county's population was 323,434 in 94,699 households.

Administrative divisions

The population history and structural changes of Marvdasht County's administrative divisions over three consecutive censuses are shown in the following table. The latest census shows five districts, 15 rural districts, and five cities.

References

 

Counties of Fars Province